Southwestern Colorado is a region in the southwest portion of Colorado, which in turn is part of the larger Four Corners region. It is bordered by Western Colorado, Southern Colorado, the south portion of Central Colorado, Utah, and New Mexico.

Counties
The definition of Southwest Colorado varies by source. The Colorado Office of Economic Development & International Trade includes the following counties in the Southwest Colorado Region: 

Archuleta County
Dolores County
La Plata County
Montezuma County
San Juan County

Paul M. O'Rourke, writing for the Colorado Bureau of Land Management, equates Southwest Colorado with the Montrose District of the Bureau of Land Management. In addition to the counties listed above, this district includes:

Delta County 
Gunnison County
Hinsdale County
Mineral County
Montrose County
Ouray County
San Miguel County

Cities

 Alamosa, Colorado
 Cortez, Colorado
 Durango, Colorado
 Monte Vista, Colorado
 Montrose, Colorado
 Mancos, Colorado

References

Regions of Colorado
Tourism regions of Colorado